Michael Phyland (born 29 September 1965) is a former Australian rules footballer who played with the Sydney Swans in the Victorian Football League (VFL).

Phyland represented New South Wales at Under 18 Championships in 1982 and won the Larke Medal.

He played four seasons for the Swans and made a total of 22 appearances.

After leaving Sydney he played with Redan in the Ballarat Football League and was the 1992 Henderson Medalist.

References

External links
 
 
 / 1988 NSW State Team

1965 births
Living people
Australian rules footballers from New South Wales
Sydney Swans players
Redan Football Club players
New South Wales Australian rules football State of Origin players